Vernède may refer to:

Arielle Vernède
R. E. Vernède
R. V. Vernède